Saru Maru is the archaeological site of an ancient monastic complex and Buddhist caves. The site is located near the village of Pangoraria, Budhani Tehsil, Sehore District, Madhya Pradesh, India. The site is about 120 km south of Sanchi.

Description
The site contains a number of stupas as well as natural caves for monks. In the caves many Buddhist graffiti have been found (swastika, triratna, kalasa ...). In the main cave were found two inscriptions of Ashoka: a version of the Minor Rock Edict n°1, one of the Edicts of Ashoka, and another inscription mentioning the visit of Piyadasi (honorific name used by Ashoka in his inscriptions) as Maharahakumara (Prince).

According to the inscription, it would seem that Ashoka visited this Buddhist monastic complex while he was still a prince, and viceroy of the region of Madhya Pradesh, while his residence was to be at Vidisha. In the Buddhist tradition, Ashoka's wife was called Vidishadevi.

Full commemorative inscription

References

External links 
 ASI Saru Maru page

Caves of Madhya Pradesh
Buddhist monasteries in India
Buddhist caves in India
Indian rock-cut architecture
Former populated places in India
Buddhist pilgrimage sites in India
Stupas in India
Architecture in India
Caves containing pictograms in India
Sehore district